This is a list of Regions of Ghana (2018 borders) by Human Development Index as of 2023 with data for the year 2021.

See also
List of countries by Human Development Index

References 

Ghana
Human Development Index
Ghana